Adam Almqvist (born February 27, 1991) is a professional Swedish ice hockey player, who is currently under contract with EV Zug of the National League (NL). Almqvist was drafted 210th overall by the Detroit Red Wings in the 2009 NHL Entry Draft.

Playing career

Junior
In early November 2009, HV71 signed Almqvist to a three-year contract. Almqvist was the highest scoring junior player in the 2010 Elitserien playoffs, recording one goal and ten assists in 16 playoff games, to help lead HV71 to the Elitserien Championship. Almqvist's eleven postseason points lead all SEL defensemen.

Professional
On May 28, 2011, Almqvist signed a three-year entry-level contract with the Detroit Red Wings.

On March 30, 2012, Almqvist made his AHL debut in a game against the Charlotte Checkers.

During the 2012–13 AHL season, Almquist was the second-leading scorer amongst defensemen for the Griffins in his first pro season in North America. Almquist recorded 10 goals and 21 assists. The Griffins finished first in the Midwest Division and captured the Calder Cup championship. Almquist played in the team's first 21 playoff games before suffering an injury after crashing into the boards in Game 3 of the finals against the Syracuse Crunch. Almquist recorded 3 goals and 7 assists in the playoffs.

In November 2013, Almqvist was called up from the Grand Rapids Griffins as an injury replacement for Brendan Smith, and he made his NHL debut on November 4, in a game against the Winnipeg Jets. On November 7, in his second NHL game, Almqvist scored his first career NHL goal against Kari Lehtonen of the Dallas Stars.

At the conclusion of his entry-level contract and unable to gain a roster spot with the Red Wings, Almqvist left North America as a restricted free agent and signed a two-year contract with Severstal Cherepovets of the KHL on June 25, 2014.

After a successful two-year return to original club HV71, culminating in capturing the Le Mat trophy in the 2016–17 season, Almqvist left to sign a two-year contract with fellow SHL club, Frölunda HC on May 8, 2017.

Upon completing his contract with the Indians, Almqvist left the SHL to sign a one-year contract with Swiss club, SC Bern, of the National League on April 11, 2018. During the Final of the NL playoffs, while playing against EV Zug, Almqvist was assessed a match penalty in third period after an illegal charge against Reto Suri, resulting in a dangerous head injury on 11 April 2019. He contributed with 4 points in 13 games to help SC Bern win of the Swiss championship.

On 7 July 2019, Almqvist returned to Russia as a free agent, agreeing to a one-year KHL contract with Admiral Vladivostok. At the conclusion of his contract with Admiral entering a hiatus, Almqvist continued in the KHL joining Belarusian club, HC Dinamo Minsk, on a one-year contract on 20 July 2020.

Career statistics

Awards and honours

References

External links

1991 births
Living people
Admiral Vladivostok players
SC Bern players
Detroit Red Wings draft picks
Detroit Red Wings players
HC Dinamo Minsk players
Frölunda HC players
Grand Rapids Griffins players
HV71 players
Severstal Cherepovets players
Swedish ice hockey defencemen
Sportspeople from Jönköping
Traktor Chelyabinsk players
EV Zug players